Tayuva is a genus of sea slugs, dorid nudibranchs, shell-less marine gastropod mollusks in the family Discodorididae.

Species 
Tayuva lilacina (Gould, 1852)
Species brought into synonymy
 Tayuva ketos Marcus & Marcus, 1967 : synonym of Tayuva lilacina (Gould, 1852)

Taxonomy
Dayrat (2010) places Discodoris lilacina (Gould, 1852) in the genus Tayuva Marcus & Marcus, 1967 (type species by original designation: Tayuva ketos Marcus & Marcus, 1967, from Pacific coast of Mexico) on the basis of a synapomorphy “a muscular wall in the distal portion of the reproductive system”. Discodoris lilacina in the current sense (e.g. Valdés, 2002) is indicated as “Tayuva lilacina of tropical Indo-West Pacific”, and several worldwide species currently recognized as valid are subsumed: Tayuva ketos as “Tayuva lilacina of Panamic Eastern Pacific” (contra Valdés, 2002 who holds Tayuva as a synonym of Discodoris and Discodoris ketos (Marcus & Marcus, 1967) as a valid species); Peltodoris hummelincki Marcus & Marcus, 1963 as “Tayuva lilacina of the Caribbean Sea”; Discodoris maculosa Bergh, 1884 as “Tayuva lilacina of the Mediterranean and Eastern European Atlantic”. Dayrat nevertheless acknowledges (p. 78) that “The name T. lilacina, as used here, likely refers to a species complex”. Alternatively these could be treated as valid species under Discodoris, following Valdés' (2002) view.

References

 Keen M. (1971). Sea shells of Tropical West America. Marine mollusks from Baja California to Perú. (2nd edit.). Stanford University Press pp. 1064: page(s): 825

External links
 Marcus Ev.; Marcus Er. (1967). American opisthobranch mollusks Part I, Tropical American opisthobranchs, Part II, Opisthobranchs from the Gulf of California. Studies in Tropical Oceanography. 6: 1–256, pl. 1
 Dayrat B. 2010.  A monographic revision of discodorid sea slugs (Gastropoda, Opisthobranchia, Nudibranchia, Doridina). Proceedings of the California Academy of Sciences, Series 4, vol. 61, suppl. I, 1–403, 382 figs.

Discodorididae